Momin Mosque is a mosque located in the district of Pirojpur.  In 2003, the Department of Archaeology recognized it as a national heritage and listed it under the name Momin Mosque for its care and protection. In 2008, the department started restoration work on the mosque.

History 
Momin Uddin Akon was driven to build a mosque due to the distance he had to walk to perform his daily prayers. He visited other Bangladeshi mosques to learn about architecture and design. He began building a mosque using bricks, and manufactured the bricks in his backyard. Soon afterwards he changed his mind, deciding to build the mosque with wood to match the wooden houses of the nearby village. The mosque's decoration includes images such as leaves, flowers and fruits such as pineapples. These images are carved on wood and painted. 

Akon employed twenty two artisans mainly from the Swarupkati area in Barisal district, and collected wood from Chittagong and Myanmar. All of the plans, layouts, designs, colors and calligraphy were solely directed by Momin Uddin Akon. Work began in 1913 and took approximately seven years to complete. 

In the late twentieth century the mosque suffered from extensive rain, causing water to deteriorate the color and integrity of the woodwork. To save the mosque, Mohammad Shahidullah, a grandson of the founder Momin Uddin Akon, began writing articles, and later published a book (Momin Mosque - Smriti Bismritir Katha), to raise awareness about the mosque.

In 2003 the mosque was recognized as a national heritage and was listed as Momin Mosque under the "Antiquities Act 1976" by the Directorate of Archaeology.

Architecture 
The architecture of the Momin Mosque differs from the more common Mughal, Parthian, and Sassanian styles. It is made of wood and devoid of nails.  It has a four sided pitch roof or chouchala covered with corrugated iron sheet, and to have more ventilation or circulation of freash air, the middle portion of the roof raised properly. This raised apex of the roof is again surmounted by dochala or two-sided pitch roof.

Momin Mosque is an oblong shaped prayer hall measuring 7.47 meter by 3.55 meter with a 15 cm thick wall made of wood, entered from east by double leaves door. Corresponding to the frontal opening, the Qibla wall has the rectangular shaped projected space used as mihrab. This mihrab is articulated by a flat wooden arch support on two posts. The prayer hall stands on a high plinth; and at present the patent stone floor is finished by neat cement. There are six five-inch square wooden posts in each longer side and three posts in each shorter side support the roof frame of the mosque.

One of two inscriptions with calligraphic designs is placed over the main entrance, and the other one is fixed over the mihrab. Information about the construction period is carved into the frontal inscription in Bengali and is situated at the right hand side of the entrance.

Ventilation is the major factor which was taken into special consideration by designing the wall. The peripheral wall is divided vertically into three parts. The lower and upper parts are encompassed by fixed perforated wooden screen or panels with different designs. The middle portion consists of two types of window; pivotal and swing. Both of them are operated from inside. There are four swing windows in the longer side and two swing windows in the shorter side each. The intermediate space between the windows has a fixed panel from outside and pivotal panel from inside.

All structural posts, purlins and rafters are made of Loha kath or Iron wood and Burma teak are used for paneling work on which all kinds of ornamentation was done. The wooden surface was painted with different colors, but during the restoration process only yellow color has been used.

Bibliography 
 "Momin Mosque before restoration." World Map-Bangladesh-Barisal Division. Web. 5 Aug 2010.
 Ahmed, Dr. Abu Sayeed M. MOSQUE ARCHITECTURE in Bangladesh. Dhaka, Bangladesh: UNESCO, 2006. 188–91. Print.
 Shahidullah, Dr. Mohammad. MOMIN MOSQUE - Smriti Bismritir Katha. Dhaka, Bangladesh: Mou Prokashoni, 2002. Print.
 Shahidullah, Dr. Mohammad. Momin Mosque of Pirojpur, Ittefaq, 20 September 2002, Print.
 Shahidullah, Dr. Mohammad. Wooden Mosque - Unique Archeological Treasure, KOUSHIKI, archeological journal, India, 2002, Print.
 H. Beveridge, Its History and statistics, The District of Bakerganj. B.C.S, Magistrate and collector of Bakerganj, 1876, Print.

References

mosque architecture
Mosques in Bangladesh
Wooden mosques
Mosques completed in 1920
Archaeological sites in Pirojpur district